John Desmond Nel (10 July 1928 – 13 January 2018) was a South African cricketer who played in six Tests from 1949 to 1957.

Nel played 35 first-class games, top-scoring for his team on several occasions. He then went onto commentating on any matches played at Newlands. He worked as a quantity surveyor.

Nel married Shelagh Mary Finegan in February 1952 and they had three sons and one daughter. He died on 13 January 2018 at the age of 89.

References

External links
 

1928 births
2018 deaths
South Africa Test cricketers
South African cricketers
Western Province cricketers
South African Universities cricketers
Alumni of Rondebosch Boys' High School